Monument to Peter I or Monument to Peter the Great may refer to:

Monument to Peter I - Monument in Moscow sculpted by Russian architect Zurab Tsereteli
Monument to Peter I - Monument in Saint Petersburg sculpted by Francesco Bartolomeo Rastrelli
Monument to Peter I - Monument in Taganrog sculpted by Mark Antokolski